British Hong Kong was a major destination for refugees fleeing China in the 20th century.

History

Before Communist China
China suffered a chronic refugee crisis in the first half of the 20th century, which worsened in the 1940s due to the Second World War and the Chinese Civil War. Hong Kong was an attractive destination for those leaving China; the China-Hong Kong border imposed few restrictions on freedom of movement. The colony implemented formal immigration controls in 1940 after Japan captured Guangzhou during the Second Sino-Japanese War; the controls had limited success.

Controls tightened at the end of the civil war. Hong Kong imposed new immigration regulations in April 1949, partly as a security measure against the Communists, and established the Frontier Closed Area border zone in 1951. On the Chinese side, the PRC - motivated by distrust of the Western Bloc - restricted cross-border movement in February 1952 by requiring entry and exit permits.

Refugees continued to arrive after the Second World War. Another wave occurred as the newly founded PRC consolidated its control in southern China. By 1957, a third of Hong Kong's population of 2.5 million were refugees. Nonetheless, PRC measures did make natural growth the main source of population growth in Hong Kong.

Later waves
The flood-famine in Northern Guangdong in Spring 1957 led to a wave of refugees in July 1957. Thousands of hungry civilians gathered at the border since February claiming to "seek relatives". Hongkongers, upon seeing the scenes in newspapers, felt pity and brought food across the border and the political impact worried the Guangdong officials. On 29 June 1957, the Guangdong committee of Chinese Communist Party authorized the Bao'an County to let the hungry get across the border.

The Great Chinese Famine caused another wave in 1962. The New York Times reported that 140,000 Chinese entered Hong Kong in 1962, with 80,000 illegally entering in a single month. The large number, increased by temporarily relaxed PRC border controls, caused a diplomatic crisis.

Policy toward refugees

Hong Kong
Dr. Edvard Hambro wrote, "Some may not be refugees in the legal sense but are in the broader sociological and humanitarian sense."

A report in 1958 by the Hong Kong government wrote, "he refugees [in 1957], however, have shown no desire to return to the mainland, even though Hong Kong is unable to offer to all the prospect of earning a reasonable living."

References

Sources 

Immigration to Hong Kong
Riots and civil disorder in China
Borders of Hong Kong
Demographics of China
Migrant crises